Human Weapon  is a television show on The History Channel that premiered on July 20, 2007. The hosts, Jason Chambers and Bill Duff, traveled around the world studying the unique martial arts, or styles of fighting, that have origins in the region.

Each episode usually consisted of a brief introduction regarding the featured martial art, including footage of established fighters sparring. The hosts would then travel to various locations, learning several strikes, blocks, or other techniques valuable to the particular art from various instructors and/or masters. Along the way, they learned about the origins and cultural history of each fighting style.  To help the viewer understand the moves the hosts learn, each technique was visually broken down with a motion capture element. Creator Terry Bullman also acted as stuntman for motion capture. After practicing featured aspects of the art, the hosts typically assessed the various skills and their effectiveness. At the end of each episode, one of the hosts would fight a representative of the episode's fighting style.

The show is similar to a later program called "Fight Quest". Lucie Bertaud also had a similar show called Face a Face which was done in France.

The show was cancelled in August 2008.

Episodes and airdates

See also

Fight Quest
Fight Science
Kill Arman

References

External links 
 Human Weapons page on The History Channel's website.
(Wayback Machine copy)
 

2007 American television series debuts
2007 American television series endings
History (American TV channel) original programming
Martial arts television series
Muay Thai television series